Frank Eck Stadium is a baseball stadium in Notre Dame, Indiana.  It hosts the University of Notre Dame Fighting Irish college baseball team.  The stadium holds 2,500 people and was built in 1994. The stadium was named after Frank Eck, an alumnus, benefactor and advisor to the university.

Since its construction, the stadium has hosted three NCAA Regionals, 1999,  2001 and 2021.

History
In June 1991, the university announced a decision to build a new baseball stadium southeast of the Joyce Center. Frank Eck, a wealthy benefactor and alumnus of the university, helped subsidize the cost of the new stadium with a sizable contribution; the total cost of the new stadium would be $5.7 million. Due to the donation, the new stadium would be named after Eck.

Construction on the new stadium would finish in Spring 1994, with the Irish's first game in the stadium being held on March 30, with a 7–6 win against Indiana. Since its construction, Frank Eck Stadium has been renovated several times. These upgrades include, but are not limited to: a 9,000-square foot indoor hitting and pitching facility; a complete remodel of the locker rooms to include 36 brand new, 30-inch wood lockers, including four specially designed corner lockers for the catchers, as well as flat-screen, HD televisions and installation of FieldTurf for the entire field.

Features
The facility has a clubhouse and locker room, training area and team rooms, indoor and outdoor hitting cages, turf field, press box, lights for night play, bench and stadium chair seating, entry plaza, concessions and restrooms.

Attendance

See also
 List of NCAA Division I baseball venues

References

External links
 Official Website

College baseball venues in the United States
Notre Dame Fighting Irish baseball venues
Sports venues in South Bend, Indiana
University of Notre Dame buildings and structures
Sports venues completed in 1994
Baseball venues in Indiana
1994 establishments in Indiana
University and college buildings completed in 1994